Tiemoko Fofana (born 22 October 1999) is an Ivorian footballer who currently plays as a forward for Azerbaijani side Sabah.

Career

Club
On 11 January 2021, Sabah announced the signing of Fofana on loan from Ilves for the remainder of the 2020–21 season.

Career statistics

Club

References

1999 births
Living people
Ivorian footballers
Ivorian expatriate footballers
Association football forwards
Veikkausliiga players
Right to Dream Academy players
FC Nordsjælland players
FC Ilves players
Ivorian expatriate sportspeople in Norway
Expatriate footballers in Norway
Ivorian expatriate sportspeople in Finland
Expatriate footballers in Finland